Dimethyl 4-(methylthio)phenyl phosphate is a chemical compound used as an insecticide and an acaricide.

References

Acetylcholinesterase inhibitors
Organophosphate insecticides
Phosphate esters
Methyl esters
Thioethers